Davide Merelli (born 3 March 1996) is an Italian footballer who plays as a goalkeeper.

Club career
Merelli made his Serie C debut for Renate on 25 September 2016 in a game against Viterbese.

On 13 July 2018, he signed a three-year contract with Padova, after playing for them on loan from Atalanta in the previous season.

References

External links
 
 

1996 births
Living people
Sportspeople from the Province of Brescia
Footballers from Lombardy
Italian footballers
Association football goalkeepers
Serie B players
Serie C players
Serie D players
Atalanta B.C. players
Forlì F.C. players
A.C. Renate players
Calcio Padova players
F.C. Rieti players